Antonio Martinelli is a French-Italian photographer born on 30 September 1953 in Venice, Italy. He currently lives in Paris.

Biography 
Venetian photographer and architect by training, Antonio Martinelli graduated from Università Iuav di Venezia (Istituto Universitario di Architettura Venezia). Established in Paris since the late 1980s, he has earned an international reputation for his long and extensive photographic experience in the fields of architecture and heritage.

From an early age he frequented the Venice Circolo Fotografico La Gondola. During his Venetian years, he became friend with Hugo Pratt for whom he made the introductory photographs of the book: Corto Maltese - Fable de Venise.

In 1979, Domus magazine commissioned the photographer to report on the construction and installation of the Teatro del Mondo in Venice, a work by architect Aldo Rossi sponsored by the Venice Biennale. Antonio Martinelli followed the evolution of the work, from the laying of the structure's first pole on the barge to the introduction into the waters of the Teatro, through to the maiden voyage in the mist of the Venetian lagoon towards the Punta della Dogana, at the entrance of the Grand Canal. After that, he accompanied the Teatro on his journey to the Adriatic Sea until Dubrovnik.

The collaboration with Domus and the Biennale opened for Martinelli the doors of the Venice Arsenal, for a work documenting the first exhibition of the Venice Biennale of Architecture: La Strada Novissima, installed in 1980 in the long Corderie building. The first photographer to have documented the Arsenal interiors, he continued this exploration for the book of Giorgio Bellavitis L’Arsenale di Venezia Storia di una grande struttura urbana (Marsilio Edition, 1983).

His friendship with Aldo Rossi and other renowned architects and historians, among which Francesco Dal Co, Manfredo Tafuri, Mario Botta, Jean-Louis Cohen, Claude Vasconi, Henri Gaudin, Massimiliano Fuksas and Peter Zumthor, led to other collaborations and projects on Venice, Italy, France and Japan.

In 1972, Martinelli set out to discover the Indian subcontinent. This trip marked the beginning of a long and passionate frequentation of India that resulted in multiple photographic projects for many publications and exhibitions throughout Europe, in New York and in India.

The photographer's interest for architecture and landscapes also led him to work for the Italian Touring Club and the publisher Franco Maria Ricci (FMR and AD Architectural Digest). From 1980, he began his collaboration with Japanese architecture magazine A + U Architecture & Urbanism, for which he carried out numerous reports and monographs on global architecture.

Photographs attributed to Martinelli are held in the Conway Library at The Courtauld Institute of Art in London, whose archive, of primarily architectural images, is in the process of being digitised under the wider Courtauld Connects project.

1995-2005: The Daniell/Martinelli Project 
Between 1995 and 2005, Antonio Martinelli worked on the Daniell/Martinelli project under the patronage of UNESCO. The project and its related exhibitions led to books published internationally under the names: Oriental Scenery: Yesterday & Today; Travels to India, Yesterday and Today; and Passaggi in India: Ieri e Oggi.

After reading Mildred Archer's Early Views India, Antonio Martinelli discovers the artistic work and adventures of English artists Thomas and William Daniell (respectively uncle and nephew), who began at the end of the 19th century a trip through the Indian subcontinent. During their travels they produced many drawings and watercolours (of cities, palaces, fortresses, temples and Indian natural wonders), helped by a camera . Upon their return to England they created, from their drawings, a long series of aquatints. These were published in six volumes (for a total of 144 aquatints) under the title Oriental Scenery.

From the end of 1995 and after extensive research work, Antonio Martinelli undertook to follow the same route as the Daniell through four trips to India. Thanks to the Daniell diaries, he identified with certainty the places visited by the two artists two hundred years before. He then positioned his camera in the same place where the artists had installed their own camera obscura, so as to obtain the same point of view and be able to show next to each other the old views and contemporary photos. The extraordinary results led to the publication of books in France, UK and India, and to several exhibitions: Victoria Memorial Hall in Calcutta in 2000, Paris in 2005, and Rome and New Delhi in 2011.

2010-2011: The Lucknow Project 
Between 2010 and 2011, in the wake of his previous work based on the Daniell engravings, he suggested to the Paris Guimet Museum a similar project for an exhibition called "Lucknow at the Mirror of Time" about the mythical city of Lucknow, in the North of India. This time though, the project was based on a comparison between the nineteenth century photos and the corresponding photos of today.

2014-2015: The Deccan Project 
In 2015, the Metropolitan Museum of Art in New York commissioned Martinelli to photograph the art and architecture of the Deccan region for the exhibition The Deccan Through a Photographer's Lens, Return to Sultans of Deccan India, 1500-1700: Opulence and Fantasy and its catalogue.

Main exhibitions 

 1991 - L’Arsenale di Venezia - Paris, Institut Culturel Italien
 1998 - Oriental Scenery: Then and Now, Art Today Gallery, New Delhi
 1999 - Venise et le Théâtre du Monde : Hommage à l’architecte Aldo Rossi, Théâtre du Rond Point des Champs-Élysées, Paris
 2000 - Oriental Scenery : Two hundred years of India’s artistic and architectural heritage -Victoria Memorial Hall - Calcutta
 2000 - Velha Goa- Fondaçao Oriente – Macau
 2001 - Velha Goa- Maison du Portugal, Paris
 2005 - Passages en Inde. Hier et Aujourd’hui– Conciergerie, Paris
 2005 - Passaggi in India. Ieri e Oggi– Scuderie del Quirinale 2005
 2011 - Oriental Scenery: Yesterday & Today– Indira Gandhi National Center for the Arts – New Delhi
 2011 - Lucknow au Miroir du Temps- Musée Guimet, Paris
 2012 - LaTendenza- Centre George Pompidou – Paris
 2013 - Venice's Arsenale 1980 - Awaiting for a New Beginning- Art Moorhouse, London
 2015 – Sultans of Deccan India, 1500-1700: Opulence and Fantasy- The Metropolitan Museum of Art - New York
 2015 - In the Footsteps of Le Corbusier- Art Heritage Gallery, New Delhi
 2018 - Pesaro, la splendeur d’une villa impériale- Institut culturel italien de Paris

Publications 
Antonio Martinelli's published books include:

 Kanch Mandir Il Tempio degli Specchi (Franco Maria Ricci)
 Teatro del Mondo - Aldo Rossi (Cluva)
 India (Touring Club Italiano)
 Carlo Scarpa (A+U)
 Firenze (Touring Club Italiano)
 Mario Botta (A+U)
 The 20th Century Architecture and Urbanism : Paris (A+U)
 The 20th Century Architecture and Urbanism : Milano (A+U)
 Voyage en Inde (Citadelles & Mazenot)
 Palais du Rajasthan (Citadelles & Mazenot)
 Lucknow au Miroir du Temps (Filigrane)
 2015 – Sultans of Deccan India, 1500-1700: Opulence and Fantasy- The Metropolitan Museum of Art - New York
 Islamic architecture of the Deccan, India, text by George Michell, Helen Philon ; photographs: Antonio Martinelli, Woodbridge : ACC Art Books, 2018, 
 Palaces of Rajasthan, Antonio Martinelli & George Michell, with Aman Nath, London : Frances Lincoln, 2005, 
 Paris architecture, 1900-2000 par Jean-Louis Cohen et Monique Eleb ; photographies d' Antonio Martinelli, Paris : Éditions Norma, 2000
 India : yesterday and today : two hundred years of architectural and topographical heritage in India, aquatints by Thomas and William Daniell ; modern photographs by Antonio Martinelli ; text by George Michell, Shrewsbury : Swan Hill Press, 1998, 
 The Royal Palaces of India, George Michell ; photographs by Antonio Martinelli, London : Thames and Hudson, 1994, 
 India, Antonio Monroy ; photographs Antonio Martinelli and Roberto Meazza, London : Orbis, 1985, 

The photographer has been  a contributor for the weekly magazines Point de Vue and Images du Monde for several years.

References 

1953 births
Living people
Italian photographers
Università Iuav di Venezia